Akkermansia is a genus in the phylum Verrucomicrobiota (Bacteria). The genus was first proposed by Derrien et al. (2004), with the type species Akkermansia muciniphila (gen. nov., sp. nov).

Etymology
The name Akkermansia derives from:New Latin feminine gender noun Akkermansia, named after Anton Dirk Louis Akkermans (28 October 1940 – 21 August 2006), a Dutch microbiologist recognized for his contribution to microbial ecology.

Until 2016 the genus contained a single known species, namely A. muciniphila (Derrien et al. 2004,  (type species of the genus).; New Latin neuter gender noun mucinum, mucin; New Latin adjective philus from Greek adjective philos (φίλος) meaning friend, loving; New Latin feminine gender adjective muciniphila, mucin-loving). However, de Vos et al. isolated a novel species in the feces of a reticulated python, Akkermansia glycaniphila.

Description of Akkermansia gen. nov.
Akkermansia (Ak.ker.man'si.a. N.L. fem. n. Akkermansia derived from Antoon Akkermans, a Dutch microbiologist recognized for his contribution to microbial ecology). Cells are oval-shaped, non-motile and stain Gram-negative. Strictly anaerobic organism. Chemo-organotrophic. Mucolytic in pure culture.

Phylogeny
The currently accepted taxonomy is based on the List of Prokaryotic names with Standing in Nomenclature (LPSN) and National Center for Biotechnology Information (NCBI)

Human metabolism

Akkermansia muciniphila can reside in the human intestinal tract and is currently being studied for its effects on human metabolism.  Recently performed studies in rodents have indicated that Akkermansia muciniphila in the intestinal tract may reduce obesity, diabetes, and inflammation. Increases in Akkermansia muciniphila have been associated with multiple sclerosis. Findings from an internationally collaborative human twin study reported in February 2016 indicate that a decrease in Akkermansia muciniphila c is associated with the increased risk of type 2 diabetes and obesity.

See also 
 Bacterial taxonomy
 Human microbiota
 Microbiology
 List of bacterial orders
 List of bacteria genera

References 

Bacteria genera
Verrucomicrobiota
Metabolism